A class II gene is a type of gene that codes for a protein. Class II genes are transcribed by RNAP II .

Class II genes have a promoter that may contain a TATA box.

Basal transcription of class II genes requires the formation of a preinitiation complex.

They are transcribed by RNA polymerase II, include both intron and exon, and code for polypeptide.

Major histocompatibility complex (MHC) class II genes are important in the immune response.

Major histocompatibility complex (MHC) II is found on antigen-presenting cells (APCs) and functions to present exogenous proteins to CD4+ T cells. MHC II thus plays an important role in activating the immune system in response to extracellular pathogens via activation of CD4+ T cells. MHC class II molecules are differentially expressed across multiple cell-types. For example, MHC II molecules are constitutively expressed in thymic epithelial cells and antigen-presenting cells (APC's), whereas they undergo interferon-γ-mediated expression in other cell types. Central to the regulation of the complex gene-expression profile exhibited by MHC class II molecules is a single master regulatory factor known as the class II transactivator (CIITA). CIITA is a non-DNA-binding co-activator whose expression is tightly controlled by a regulatory region containing three independent promoters (pI, pIII and pIV).

References 

Genes
Molecular biology